Tempo FM is the local community radio station for Wetherby, Boston Spa, as well as the surrounding villages in the West Yorkshire and North Yorkshire areas.  The radio station mainly plays easy listening music and is run entirely by volunteers as a "Not for Profit" company.

Background

The radio station was the idea of Bob Preedy who applied for the licence.  With the help of a team of volunteers, it commenced broadcasting on 107.4 MHz on 11 September 2006 in Wetherby, West Yorkshire.  The station plays easy listening music, during weekdays with specialist live and recorded programmes during the evenings.  A wide range of music is played during the evenings, weekends and Bank Holidays presented by many local presenters.   The radio station is funded partly by advertising, supplemented by donations and grants.  The current Programme Controller is Steve France, who is also a member of the management team comprising:- Alan Everard, Eric Ovenden, Jon Beeson and Mike Davison.

In November 2011, Tempo FM presenter Wayne Bavin set a record by presenting a 60-hour-long radio show, raising some £1800 for "Children in Need" and beating the record set by Chris Moyles of Radio 1 by several hours.  Similar broadcasting attempts have been made and all are subject to final confirmation by Guinness.

The current licence period for Tempo FM expires on 10 September 2026.

Broadcast Area
The station was originally based at the Engine Shed, Wetherby. In October 2012 it moved to new purpose built studios in the One Stop Centre in Westgate, Wetherby.  At the same time it moved its transmitter to higher ground near Collingham.  It covers Wetherby, Boston Spa, Collingham, Tadcaster, and Harewood, the station can also be heard in many places in the neighbouring county of North Yorkshire.  The station also 'streams' on-line around the world.

Presenters 

Steve France,
Mike Davison,
Eric Ovenden,
Tony Haynes,
John Appleson,
Paul Winn,
John Leetch,
Kevin Rouse,
Norah Barnes,
Gary Roberts,
Alex Foreman,
Nick Brown,
Jon Bee,
John Marley,
Pete Issett,
Andy Andrews,
Rob Allen,
Pete Willett,
Chris Helmes,
Emily Kerr,
(Big John) Burrows,
Beth Burrows.
Guest features by:
Wetherby Neighbourhood Policing Team,
Wetherby U3A Creative Writing Group,
Wetherby High School – Radio Academy,

Slogans
 Your easy connection to Wetherby and Boston Spa (2006–2008)
 Easy listening radio from Wetherby (2008 to 2009)
 Your Radio out of Wetherby (2009 to 2010)
 Wetherby's Brighter Radio Station (2010 to 2011)
 Good Times...Great Songs from the Heart of Yorkshire (2011 to October 2014)
 Good Times...Great Songs (October 2014 to present)

References

External links
 Tempo FM
 Ofcom Service Details
 Key commitments to Ofcom
 Ofcom service area map

Mass media in Leeds
Radio stations in Yorkshire
Wetherby